Robert Charles McDermott (born August 5, 1963) is an American politician and a Republican member of the Hawaii House of Representatives since November 6, 2012, representing District 40 (ʻEwa, ʻEwa Beach, ʻEwa Gentry, Iroquois Point).

McDermott previously served three terms in the Hawaii House of Representatives from 1996 until 2002, but left to run unsuccessfully for Hawaii's 2nd congressional district in the United States House of Representatives. He was the Republican nominee for U.S. Senator from Hawaii and ran against incumbent Senator Brian Schatz in the November 2022 general election, in which he lost.

Education 
McDermott is a 1981 graduate of Upper Perkiomen High School in Pennsburg, Pennsylvania. He earned his BA in economics and his MBA from Chaminade University of Honolulu.

Political views 
McDermott made headlines in 2013 for his vocal opposition to same-sex marriage. It ultimately became law, and Bob McDermott turned his focus on Pono Choices, a sex education program in Hawaii. On January 8, 2014, McDermott held a press conference in opposition to Pono Choices in which he gave a presentation on oral sex, vaginal sex, and anal sex, in contrast with what he said the program teaches.

In July 2022, McDermott said he was the first elected official to call for closure of the U.S. military's Red Hill Underground Fuel Storage Facility, which he identified as the biggest issue facing Hawaii. He has criticized Hawaii's congressional delegation for slowness to take action, saying he would have done so safely within a year and a half.

2018 gubernatorial run 
McDermott announced his intent to run for Governor of Hawaii in the 2018 election on May 12, 2017. He withdrew his candidacy in August 2017.

Controversies 
On March 14, 2016, during a debate over the state budget, McDermott yelled profanities at fellow Republicans for not volunteering time to him as he was at the limit of his allotted time. McDermott told his colleagues to "start acting like (expletive) Republicans" and "do your (expletive) job."

McDermott made headlines again in March 2017 after voting Beth Fukumoto out of her position as House Minority Leader, saying that her criticisms of Donald Trump and attendance at the Women's March were only to gain publicity for herself. Fukumoto then left the Republican party, citing racism and sexism within the party as her reasons for leaving.

Elections 
1996 – When Democratic Representative Robert Bunda ran for Hawaii Senate and left the House District 32 seat open, McDermott was unopposed for the September 21, 1996, Republican Primary, winning with 304 votes, and won the November 5, 1996, General election with 2,483 votes (53.5%) against Democratic nominee Leonard Pepper.
1998 – McDermott was unopposed for the September 19, 1998, Republican Primary, winning with 304 votes, and won the November 3, 1998, General election with 2,796 votes (54.9%) against Democratic nominee Wilfred Tangonan.
2000 – McDermott was unopposed for the September 23, 2000, Republican Primary, winning with 785 votes, and won the November 7, 2000, General election with 2,686 votes (56.4%) against Democratic nominee Eddie Aguinaldo.
2002 – Expecting to challenge incumbent Democratic United States Representative Patsy Mink for Hawaii's 2nd congressional district seat, McDermott won the September 21, 2002, Republican Primary with 20,180 votes (49.5%); Mink had been hospitalized after announcing her re-election candidacy, and died the week after the primary, but too late to be replaced on the General election ballot; she was elected posthumously in the four-way November 5, 2002 General election. McDermott did not run in the November 30, 2002, Special election to succeed her in the interim, as an election to fill the remainder of her term was scheduled for January 4, 2003.
2003 – McDermott ran in the 91-candidate Special election on January 4 to succeed Congresswoman Mink, but lost to Ed Case, who had won the interim special election, and held the seat until 2007.
2012 – With Democratic Representative Sharon Har redistricted to District 42, McDermott was unopposed in District 40's August 11, 2012, Republican Primary, winning with 754 votes. He won the November 6, 2012, General election with 3,249 votes (48.8%) against Democratic nominee Chris Manabat, who had won the six-way Democratic Primary in a field which included former Representative Romy Mindo.
2014 – McDermott beat Democratic candidate Rose Martinez, 60.0% to 36.4%.
2016 – McDermott won against Democratic candidate Rose Martinez, 54.6% to 38.5%.
2018 – McDermott defeated Democratic candidate Rose Martinez, 53.4% to 42.3%.
2020 – McDermott beat Democratic candidate Rose Martinez, 55.7% to 40.4%.
2022 – McDermott won the 5-way Republican primary for U.S. Senator from Hawaii with 25,557 votes (31.9%). He faced incumbent Senator Brian Schatz in the November general election and lost the election by a 45% margin.

References

External links 
Official page at the Hawaii State Legislature
Campaign site
 

1963 births
21st-century American politicians
Candidates in the 2022 United States Senate elections
Chaminade University of Honolulu alumni
Living people
Republican Party members of the Hawaii House of Representatives
Place of birth missing (living people)